Heinrich Zollinger (22 March 1818 – 19 May 1859) was a Swiss botanist.

Zollinger was born in Feuerthalen, Switzerland.

From 1837 to 1838 he studied botany at the University of Geneva under Augustin and Alphonse Pyramus de Candolle, but had to interrupt his studies due to financial problems.

In 1842 he moved to Java, working in a botanical garden, and on small government-financed scientific expeditions. He returned to Switzerland in 1848, but came back to Java in 1855 with his wife and two children.

The species Clavaria zollingeri described scientifically by French mycologist Joseph-Henri Léveillé in 1846 was named after Heinrich Zollinger, who researched the genus Clavaria, and collected the type specimen in Java.

Zollinger died in Kandangan, a village located near Mount Bromo in East Java, Indonesia. He had been suffering from the long-term effects of malaria.

References

External links 

 Short bio

People from Feuerthalen
1818 births
1859 deaths
19th-century Swiss botanists
Deaths from malaria